Noctua interposita is a moth of the family Noctuinae. It is found in Europe.

The wingspan is 39–45 mm.

The larvae feed on various herbaceous plants and grasses.

Noctua (moth)
Moths of Europe
Moths described in 1790